"If I Were You" is a song written by John Hobbs and Chris Farren, and recorded by American country music singer Collin Raye.  It was released in April 1995 as the fifth and final single from his album Extremes.  It peaked at #4 both in the United States and in Canada. The song is not to be confused with a different composition titled "If I Were You", which appears on Raye's debut album All I Can Be.

Chart positions
"If I Were You" debuted at number 62 on the U.S. Billboard Hot Country Singles & Tracks for the week of April 8, 1995.

Year-end charts

References

1995 singles
1994 songs
Collin Raye songs
Song recordings produced by Paul Worley
Epic Records singles
Songs written by Chris Farren (country musician)